Araçariguama is a city on the state of São Paulo in Brazil. It is part of the Metropolitan Region of Sorocaba. The population of city is of 22,860 (2020 est.) in an area of 145.20 km². The elevation is 695 m. Araçariguama was established in 1653.

Population history

Demographics

According to the 2000 IBGE Census, the population was 11,154, of which 7,240 are urban and 3,914 are rural. The average life expectancy was 69.03 years. The literacy rate was 89.99%.

References

External links
  http://www.aracariguama.sp.gov.br
  Araçariguama on citybrazil.com.br

Municipalities in São Paulo (state)
Populated places established in 1653
1653 establishments in the Portuguese Empire